Ranjith Padinhateeri is an Indian biological physicist and a professor at the Indian Institute of Technology, Mumbai. He is known for his biological studies using statistical mechanics, polymer physics, and soft matter theory. The Department of Biotechnology of the Government of India awarded him the National Bioscience Award for Career Development, one of the highest Indian science awards, for his contributions to biosciences, in 2017–18.

Biography 

Ranjith Padinhateeri, born in Malappuram district of the south Indian state of Kerala, did his early schooling at 
AUP School Marakkara, V. V. M. Higher Secondary School and MSM HSS Kallingalparamba before joining Zamorin’s Guruvayurappan College to obtain a BSc in physics from the University of Calicut in 1997. Moving to Chennai, he earned his MSc from the Indian Institute of Technology, Madras in 2000 and continued there for his doctoral studies under the guidance of P. B. Sunil Kumar which earned him a PhD in 2005 for his thesis, Statistical mechanics of semiflexible polymers : A study of single filaments. His post doctoral training, initially, were under John F. Marko at two US universities, University of Illinois at Chicago and Northwestern University from 2005 to 2007 when he moved to France to continue his training at the laboratories of Jean-Francois Joanny and David Lacoste of Institut Curie during 2007–09. He returned to India in 2009 to join the Indian Institute of Technology, Mumbai as an assistant professor where he served as an associate professor from 2014 and holds the position of professor since 2018 at the department of biosciences and bioengineering.

Padinhateeri is known to be involved in studies in the field of biological physics, focusing on cellular processes applying nonequilibrium approaches. His approach also involves employment of tools from physics such as polymer physics and soft-matter theory. He has published a number of articles; ResearchGate, an online repository of scientific articles has listed 34 of them.

Awards and honors 
The Department of Biotechnology of the Government of India awarded him the National Bioscience Award for Career Development, one of the highest Indian science awards, for him contributions to biosciences, in 2017–18. He is also a recipient of Innovative Young Investigator Award of the Department of Biotechnology (2009-2010), IIT Mumbai Young Investigator Award (2012), Senior Innovative Young Investigator Award, Department of Biotechnology (2013),  and Excellence in Teaching Award of IIT Mumbai (2014).

Selected bibliography

See also 

 Nucleosome
 Saccharomyces cerevisiae

Notes

References

Further reading

External links 
 

N-BIOS Prize recipients
Indian scientific authors
Living people
Malayali people
Scientists from Kerala
University of Calicut alumni
IIT Madras alumni
Academic staff of IIT Bombay
University of Illinois Chicago alumni
Northwestern University alumni
People from Malappuram district
Indian physicists
Year of birth missing (living people)